High affinity immunoglobulin gamma Fc receptor I is a protein that in humans is encoded by the FCGR1A gene.

Interactions 

The FcgRI binds the Fc portion of IgG and causes activation of the host cell via an intercellular ITAM motif.

References

Further reading

External links 
 

Fc receptors